Peter Charles Orton, CVO (17 June 1943 – 5 December 2007) was a British media entrepreneur and television producer noted for his work in children's television. He, Muppets creator Jim Henson and businesswoman Sophie Turner Laing founded HIT Entertainment in 1982. Orton led the company from 1989 to 2005 when he sold it to Apax. After HiT was sold to Apax in 2005, he retired but kept close contacts with the entertainment world.

Personal life
Orton married his wife Susan Stevenson in 1972. They have a son named Jamie.

President of Royal Wootton Bassett RFC
Peter was also a much loved president of Royal Wootton Bassett Rugby Football Club. Peter would visit and support the team whenever business commitments would allow. Peter was instrumental in the club's move to impressive new premises at Ballard's Ash on the edge of the town. He would certainly have been very proud of the opening of the new clubhouse, the Peter Orton Pavilion on 7 September 2013. The clubhouse was unveiled with a tribute to Peter by RFU president Robert Reeves.

Illness and death 
After being diagnosed with neck cancer in 1996, he served as chairman of the Head and Neck Cancer Research Trust.

Orton died of cancer in 2007 at the age of 64.

Honours
Peter Orton was honoured with a BAFTA Special Award, the lifetime achievement award, in 2002 for his significant contribution within the children's television sector.

Peter Orton was appointed a Commander of the Royal Victorian Order (CVO) in the 2007 New Year Honours for his contribution to children's literacy.

References

External links

1943 births
2007 deaths
Commanders of the Royal Victorian Order
Mass media people from Portsmouth
British television executives
British television producers
HIT Entertainment